Peka is a town in the Leribe District of Lesotho. It has a population of approximately 17,161 (2005).

Populated places in Leribe District